The All-Ireland Minor Camogie Championship is a competition for under-18 teams in the women's field sport of camogie. Counties compete for the Síghle Nic an Ultaigh Cup. There are graded competitions at Minor B and Minor C level.

History
The competition was established in 1974 for under-16 teams. In 2006 the age limit was raised from 16 to 18 and a separate under-16 championship established. Championships are also held at Minor B and Minor C level.

Top winners
Click on the year for details and team line-outs from each individual championship.

All Ireland Minor Camogie Finals
In 2006 the age limit for minor was raised from under-16 to under-18, to bring camogie in line with other Gaelic Games.

The first figure is the number of goals scored (equal to 3 points each) and the second total is the number of points scored, the figures are combined to determine the winner of a match in Gaelic Games

Click on the year for details and team line-outs from each individual championship.
 
 2006 Kilkenny 4–10 Galway 2-05
 2007 Kilkenny 3–12 Cork 0-07
 2008 Kilkenny 3–15 Clare 1-07
 2009 Kilkenny 5–10 Clare 3-08 
 2010 Galway 1-07 Clare 1-07
Replay Galway 2–12 Clare 2-08
 2011 Tipperary 4-04 Kilkenny 2-09
 2012 Galway 2–12 Kilkenny 1–10
 2013 Kilkenny 3–4 Cork 1–10
 Replay Kilkenny 1–12 Cork 0-06
 2014 Limerick 2–11 Cork 3-08
 Replay Limerick 3–11 Cork 1-09
 2015 Kilkenny 3-09 Tipperary 1–12
 2016 Tipperary 2-10 Galway 1-13
 Replay Tipperary 4-09 Galway 2-06
 2017 Galway 4–14 Clare 0-06
 2018 Cork 0-18 Galway 1-11
 2019 Cork 3–15 Clare 2–12
 2020 Not Played
 2021 Kilkenny 2–12 Cork 0-12
 2022 Cork 2–11 Galway 2-07

All Ireland Minor B Finals
Click on the year for details and team line-outs from each individual championship.
In 2006 the age limit for minor was raised from under-16 to under-18, to bring camogie in line with other Gaelic Games.

2006 Down 5-08 Antrim 6-04
 2007 Antrim 3-18 Down 5-03
 2008 Offaly 4-13 Waterford 2-07
 2009 Limerick 3-10 Waterford 1-15 
 2010 Derry 3-10 Antrim 0-09
 2011 Limerick 4-10 Antrim 2-08
 2012 Derry 2-16 Wexford 2-05
 2013 Offaly 6-14 Wexford 1-07
 2014 Waterford 4-06 Derry 0-02
 2015 Meath 4-06 Derry 2-10
 2016 Down 1-06 Roscommon 0-06
 2017 Antrim 1-11 Kildare 2-05
 2018 Antrim 3.13 Westmeath 3.12
 2019 Laois 4-06 Limerick 2-05
 2020 Not Played
 2021 Antrim 2-07 Offaly 0-13
 Replay Antrim 3-15 Offaly 3-08
 2022 Offaly 2-10 Laois 1-12

All Ireland Minor C Finals

 2009 Laois 3-05 Carlow 2-03
 2010 Carlow 5-10 Armagh 1-12
 2011 Armagh 3-05 Meath 1-10
 2012 Down 1-16 Kerry 0-10
 2013 Kildare 2-11 Armagh 2-09
 2014 Meath 1-13 Armagh 0-05
 2015 Roscommon 2-06 Armagh 0-04
 2016 Armagh 2-16 Westmeath 1-11
 2017 Carlow 4-10 Roscommon 0-12
 2018
 2019 Tyrone 3-12 Kerry 0-06
 2020 Not Played
 2021 Cavan 2-05 Mayo 0-08
 2022 Wicklow 4-04 Mayo 0-06

All-Ireland Under 16 Championship: Top Winners

All Ireland Under-16 Camogie Finals
Until 2006 when the age limit for minor was raised from under-16 to under-18, to bring camogie in line with other Gaelic games, the description "minor" was applied to under-16 camogie competitions from 1974 to 2005 which were played at under-16 level. Hence the under-16 competition from 1974 to 2005 was described as "minor" in contemporary documentation and media.

 1974 Down 3-00 Cork 0-01
 1975 Cork 6-02 Galway 0-03
 1976 Cork 4-06 Down 2-01
 1977 Galway 5-04 Dublin 2-01
 1978 Cork 5-01 Dublin 3-04
 1979 Cork 5-03 Cavan 3-00
 1980 Cork 5-05 Cavan 0-02
 1981 Galway 3-04 Antrim 3-03
 1982 Dublin 5-02 Galway 2-03
 1983 Cork 3-03 Dublin 2-03
 1984 Cork 2-12 Galway 5-00
 1985 Cork 3-08 Galway 2-03
 1986 Galway 2-08 Wexford 1-04
 1987 Galway 1-11 Cork 3-03
 1988 Kilkenny 5-06 Armagh 2-05
 1989 Kilkenny 9-10 Tipperary 3-08
 1990 Tipperary 2-11 Kilkenny 3-06
 1991 Kilkenny 4-12 Galway 3-07
 1992 Tipperary 4-09 Kilkenny 1-03
 1993 Tipperary 1-05 Galway 1-05
 Replay Tipperary 3-10 Galway 2-09
 1994 Galway 7-13 Tipperary 3-09
 1995 Wexford 2-09 Galway 1-07
 1996 Galway 3-16 Tipperary 4-11
 1997 Galway 2-14 Cork 1-06
 1998 Cork 3-18 Derry 1-05
 1999 Cork 2-12 Galway 3-08
 2000 Galway 2-09 Wexford 0-03
 2001 Cork 6-15 Kilkenny 2-07
 2002 Cork 2-11 Galway 1-05
 2003 Cork 3-12 Galway 1-04
 2004 Galway 3-16 Kilkenny 2-06
 2005 Kilkenny 4-07 Tipperary 2-07
 2006 Kilkenny 2-10 Cork 0-04
 2007 Kilkenny 8-11 Cork 0-06
 2008 Kilkenny 3-06 Cork 2-04
 2009 Galway 2-11 Tipperary 2-07
 2010 Galway 2-11 Tipperary 2-07
 2011 Tipperary 2-08 Kilkenny 0-13
 2012 Dublin 4-10 Galway 2-08
 2013 Tipperary 4-06 Galway 2-08
 2014 Tipperary 3-13 Galway 1-07
 2015 Galway beat Cork
 2016 Galway 3-14 Kilkenny 1-11
 2017 Galway 2-16 Wexford 2-05
 2018 Galway 3-14 Cork 1-07
 2019 Cork 1-14 Galway 2-10
 2020 Not Played
 2021 Cork 2-12 Kilkenny 2-10
 2022 Cork 2-18 Tipperary 0-10

All Ireland Under-16 B Finals
The under-16 B competition from 2000 to 2005 was described as "minor B" in contemporary documentation and media.

 2000 Laois 9-14 Tyrone 2-01
 2001 Limerick 3-18 Carlow 1-01
 2002 Limerick 5-07 Offaly 0-02
 2003 Waterford 6-11 Armagh 1-04
 2004 Antrim 1-09 Roscommon 0-03
 2005 Offaly 2-14 Armagh 3-09
 2006 Derry 3-03 Armagh 1-02
 2007 Derry 2-07 Waterford 3-04
 Replay Derry 3-14 Waterford 2-02
 2008 Derry 6-18 Offaly 0-06
 2009 Wexford 2-11 Waterford 1-12 
 2010 Derry 3-09 Limerick 1-06 
 2011 Limerick 3-12 Offaly 0-09
 2012 Offaly 5-10 Derry 2-06
 2013 Cork 4-08 Waterford 2-10
 2014 Waterford 6-17 Derry 3-05
 2015 Waterford 2-08 Dublin 1-07
 2016 Westmeath 2-13 Laois 0-06
 2017 Laois 3-06 Antrim 1.10
 2018 Antrim 3-09 Derry 2-06
 2019 Waterford
 2020 Not Played
 2021 Meath 9-13  Offaly 4-12
 2022 Laois 4-07 Antrim 3-07

All Ireland Under-16 C Finals

 2009 Westmeath 6-09 Tyrone 5-03
 2010 Carlow 4-08 Meath 1-04 
 2011 Down 1-03 Carlow 1-02
 2012 Westmeath 1-10 Armagh 2-04
 2013 Meath 1-10 Laois 2-03
 2014 Laois
 2015 Westmeath
 2016 Kildare 1-11 Carlow 1-08
 2017 Armagh 2-09 Carlow 2-08
 2018 Carlow
 2019 Roscommon
 2020 Not Played
 2021 Westmeath 1-01  Roscommon 0-03
 2022

All Ireland Under-16 D Finals
 2021 Wicklow 3-11 Mayo 0-02
 2022

See also
 All-Ireland Senior Camogie Championship
 All-Ireland Junior Camogie Championship
 All-Ireland Intermediate Camogie Championship
 Wikipedia List of Camogie players
 National Camogie League
 Camogie All Stars Awards
 Ashbourne Cup

References

External links
 An Cumann Camógaíochta
 Camogie on official GAA website
 Camogie on GAA Oral History Project

 
4